Ram Head or Rame Head may refer to:

 Ram Head, a headland within the Bay of Isles on South Georgia Island, Antarctica
 Ram Head, a headland in Massachusetts Bay, Massachusetts, United States
 Ram Head, the southernmost point on Saint John, U.S. Virgin Islands
 Rame Head, a headland in Cornwall, England also known as Ram Head
 Rame Head (Victoria), a headland in Victoria, Australia also known as Ram Head
 Rams Head, a mountain in the Ramshead Range of Australia
 Ram's head, a common name for the mushroom Grifola frondosa